The enzyme fatty-acyl-ethyl-ester synthase (EC 3.1.1.67) catalyzes the reaction

a long-chain-fatty-acyl ethyl ester + H2O  a long-chain-fatty acid + ethanol

This enzyme belongs to the family of hydrolases, specifically those acting on carboxylic ester bonds.  The systematic name is long-chain-fatty-acyl-ethyl-ester acylhydrolase. This enzyme is also called FAEES.

References

 

EC 3.1.1
Enzymes of unknown structure